Shellman is a city in Randolph County, Georgia, United States. The population was 1,083 at the 2010 census. Buildings in the commercial center have been designated as an historic district and listed in 1985 on the National Register of Historic Places.

Geography
Shellman is located at  (31.758473, -84.612731).

History
The community is named after W.F. Shellman, who had donated funds to a local school.

The Shellman Historic District is listed on the National Register of Historic Places.

Demographics

2020 census

As of the 2020 United States census, there were 861 people, 374 households, and 213 families residing in the city.

2000 census
As of the census of 2000, there were 1,166 people, 407 households, and 297 families residing in the city. The racial makeup of the city was 30.53% White, 68.87% African American, 0.09% Native American, 0.17% Pacific Islander, and 0.34% from two or more races. Hispanic or Latino of any race were 0.43% of the population.

There were 407 households, out of which 34.2% had children under the age of 18 living with them, 39.8% were married couples living together, 27.5% had a female householder with no husband present, and 27.0% were non-families. 24.6% of all households were made up of individuals, and 13.5% had someone living alone who was 65 years of age or older. The average household size was 2.86 and the average family size was 3.45.

In the city, the population was spread out, with 32.5% under the age of 18, 10.4% from 18 to 24, 23.1% from 25 to 44, 21.3% from 45 to 64, and 12.8% who were 65 years of age or older. The median age was 32 years. For every 100 females, there were 84.2 males. For every 100 females age 18 and over, there were 71.5 males.

The median income for a household in the city was $20,950, and the median income for a family was $29,583. Males had a median income of $27,875 versus $18,462 for females. The per capita income for the city was $11,267. About 30.1% of families and 33.2% of the population were below the poverty line, including 45.1% of those under age 18 and 29.5% of those age 65 or over.

Notable people
Thomas Davis, NFL defensive player, grew up in Shellman.
Donnell Harvey, former NBA athlete, grew up here. 
Diadourius Boudleaux Bryant, part of the prolific songwriting team of Felice and Boudleaux Bryant, was born in Shellman in 1920.
Paul C. Broun Sr., Georgia State Senator was born here in 1916

Gallery

References

Cities in Georgia (U.S. state)
Cities in Randolph County, Georgia